In operator theory, a bounded operator T on a Hilbert space is said to be nilpotent if Tn = 0 for some n. It is said to be quasinilpotent  or topologically  nilpotent if its spectrum σ(T) = {0}.

Examples
In the finite-dimensional case, i.e. when T is a square matrix with complex entries, σ(T) = {0} if and only if
T is similar to a matrix whose only nonzero entries are on the superdiagonal, by the Jordan canonical form. In turn this is equivalent to Tn = 0 for some n. Therefore, for matrices, quasinilpotency coincides with nilpotency.

This is not true when H is infinite-dimensional. Consider the Volterra operator, defined as follows: consider the unit square X = [0,1] × [0,1] ⊂ R2, with the Lebesgue measure m. On X, define the (kernel) function K by

 

The Volterra operator is the corresponding integral operator T on the Hilbert space L2(0,1) given by

The operator T is not nilpotent: take f to be the function that is 1 everywhere and direct calculation shows that 
Tn f ≠ 0 (in the sense of L2) for all n. However, T is quasinilpotent. First notice that K is in L2(X, m), therefore T is compact. By the spectral properties of compact operators, any nonzero λ in σ(T) is an eigenvalue. But it can be shown that T has no nonzero eigenvalues, therefore T is quasinilpotent.

Operator theory